Mark Knowles and Anna-Lena Grönefeld were the defending champions but Grönefeld did not compete. Knowles partnered with Katarina Srebotnik but they lost in the third round to Paul Hanley and Chan Yung-jan.

Leander Paes and Cara Black defeated Wesley Moodie and Lisa Raymond in the final, 6–4, 7–6(7–5) to win the mixed doubles tennis title at the 2010 Wimbledon Championships.

Seeds
All seeds received a bye into the second round. 

  Nenad Zimonjić /  Samantha Stosur (third round)
  Leander Paes /  Cara Black (champions)
  Mahesh Bhupathi /  Liezel Huber (second round)
  Oliver Marach /  Nuria Llagostera Vives (second round)
  Mark Knowles /  Katarina Srebotnik (third round)
  Daniel Nestor /  Bethanie Mattek-Sands (third round)
  Max Mirnyi /  Alisa Kleybanova (third round)
  Mariusz Fyrstenberg /  Yan Zi (third round)
  Lukáš Dlouhý /  Iveta Benešová (semifinals)
  Marcelo Melo /  Rennae Stubbs (semifinals)
  Wesley Moodie /  Lisa Raymond (final)
  Paul Hanley /  Chan Yung-jan (quarterfinals)
  Robert Lindstedt /  Ekaterina Makarova (second round)
  Marc López /  Anabel Medina Garrigues (withdrew)
  Andy Ram /  Elena Vesnina (second round)
  Marcin Matkowski /  Tathiana Garbin (second round)

Draw

Finals

Top half

Section 1

Section 2

Bottom half

Section 3

Section 4

References

External links

2010 Wimbledon Championships on WTAtennis.com
2010 Wimbledon Championships – Doubles draws and results at the International Tennis Federation

X=Mixed Doubles
Wimbledon Championship by year – Mixed doubles